Gusheh-ye Badi ol Zaman (also Romanized as Gūsheh-ye Badī‘ ol Zamān; also known as Badī‘ oz Zamān, Gusa, Gūseh, and Gūsheh-ye Sālārābād) is a village in Gamasiyab Rural District, in the Central District of Nahavand County, Hamadan Province, Iran. At the 2006 census, its population was 452, in 136 families.

References 

Populated places in Nahavand County